Flema is an Argentine punk rock band, that managed to find a unique style in South America, among others. The last configuration of the band was: Ricky Espinosa (Vocals and Guitar), Fernando Rossi (Bass), Luis Garibaldo (Guitar), and Pepe Carvallo (Drums). Their songs usually deal with loneliness, alcohol and drugs, friends, women, politics, and complaints about the tough things in life. Their songs have titles like "Borrachos en la esquina" (drunken on the corner), "Semen de buey" (bullock semen), "el blanco cristal" (the white crystal). The band leader, Ricardo Espinosa (also known as 'Ricky') was a very controversial and beloved figure, and the core and spirit of Flema. Always drunk, always on coke, always in trouble, often the band could not play on a scheduled date because Espinosa and other band members were detained at a local police station.

Early days and development 
The band was formed in 1987, in Avellaneda (Buenos Aires) by a group of teenaged students. There were a lot of changes in its lineups, with Espinosa as the only constant member.
Always an underground band, Flema launched their first record in the year 1992 ("Pogo, mosh & Slam"), through an independent record company.

The band acquired great success in the Argentine punk scene, not reaching the masses only because of the reputations of the members, specially Espinosa. Their shows were marked by chaos, the members usually drunken and doped on the stage, Espinosa fighting with the public, sniffing cocaine on the stage, etc. Their songs often featured guttural vomit-like sounds performed by Espinosa, that were one of Flema's trademarks. Happy melodies mixed with profound and touching lyrics written by the perturbed Espinosa caught up the feelings of many teenagers that saw their problems reflected in the songs of that band from the suburbs.

Espinosa's death 
On May 30, 2002, Ricardo Manuel Espinosa died falling off the 5th floor of a building in Avellaneda. He was 34 years old. On the date of the incident he was drunk playing a Winning Eleven match with on a PlayStation 2 at Luichi's (Luis Garibaldo) house, located on the 5th floor of the monoblock in Avellaneda. He said jokingly to his friend Luichi "If I lose, I'm gonna jump through the window" - He lost and stood on the rails of the balcony, but was too disoriented and further destabilized by the wind, which caused him to slip, this is confirmed by Luichi and also Ricky Espinoza's father Orlando Espinoza. He had been talking about putting an end to his life for years, even writing songs with titles like "I'm Gonna Commit Suicide", "I Have To Go", and "You Will Remember Me". This caused many to believe it was on purpose. During funeral preparations, the large number of fans and punks at the funeral home caused the owners to suspend it. He had to be mourned at his brothers patio, where Christian Aldana, guitarist and singer of Otro Yo as well as Niko Villano, singer of Villanos also assisted. Three days after his death, the rest of the band put on a big show with other local groups in his honor. Flema was officially disbanded after that.

Every 30 May, hundreds of fans visit Espinosa's tomb at green ward Juan XIII in Avellaneda cemetery.

Lineups of Flema

1987:The original formation
Fernando Cordera - vocals
Juan Fandiño - Guitar
Ricky Espinosa - Guitar
Pablo Sara - Bass
Sebastián Gador - drums

1988: period of Invasion 88 
Fernando Cordera - vocals
Juan Fandiño - Guitar
Ricky Espinosa - Guitar
Alejandro Kohl - Bass
Sebastián Gador - drums

1992: Pogo, mosh & slam 
Ricky Espinosa - Vocals
Cacho Rossi - Bass
Luis Rossi - Guitar
Pepe Alsina - drums

1993: Nunca nos fuimos 
Ricky Espinosa - Vocals
Fernando Rossi - Bass
Santiago Rossi - Guitar
Gonzalo Díaz Colodrero - Guitar
Alejandro Alsina - drums

1994: El exceso y/o abuso de drogas y alcohol es perjudicial para tu salúd... ¡Cuídate, nadie lo hará por vos! 
Ricky Espinosa - Vocals
Fernando Rossi - Bass
Luichi Gribaldo - Guitar
Pepe Carballo - drums
Santiago Rossi - Guitar

1997: Si el placer es un pecado, bienvenidos al infierno 
Ricky Espinosa - Vocals
Fernando Rossi - Bass
Santiago Rossi - Guitar
Luichi Gribaldo - Guitar
Pablo Martínez - drums

1998: period of Resaka 
Ricky Espinosa - Vocals
Fernando Rossi - Bass
Gustavo Brea - Guitar
Luichi Gribaldo - Guitar
Pablo Martínez - drums

1999: Last formation
 Ricky Espinosa - Vocals
 Fernando Rossi - Bass
 Maximiliano Martin - Guitar
 Luichi Gribaldo - Guitar
 Diego Piazza - drums

Discography 
Pogo, Mosh & Slam, 1992
Nunca Nos Fuimos, 1994
El Exceso de Drogas y Alcohol es Perjudicial Para tu Salud, 1995
Si el Placer es Un Pecado, Bienvenidos Al Infierno, 1997
Resaka, 1998
La Noche de las Narices Blancas, 2000
Caretofobia I, 2000
Caretofobia II, 2001
Cinco de copas, 2002

See also 
Argentine punk
Punk rock

References

External links 
 The birth of Flema (in Spanish)
 Live fast, die young (in Spanish)

Argentine punk rock groups
Musical groups established in 1987
Musical groups disestablished in 2002
Musical quintets